Un'estate ai Caraibi is a 2009 Italian comedy film directed by Carlo Vanzina.  It stars Gigi Proietti, Enrico Brignano, Carlo Buccirosso, Biagio Izzo, and Martina Stella.

Plot
Several groups of Italians experience amusing adventures and tests of character on the Caribbean island of Antigua. Some of the characters are there simply for rest and relaxation, while others act with different motivations. Multiple plot lines unfold simultaneously as different characters' stories are presented.

Cast
 Gigi Proietti as Alberto
 Enrico Brignano as Angelo 
 Carlo Buccirosso as Roberto
 Biagio Izzo as Vincenzo 
 Martina Stella as Laura
 Enrico Bertolino as Giacomo
 Alena Seredova as Anna
 Paolo Ruffini as Max
 Paolo Conticini as Tommy
 Jayde Nicole as Jennifer
 Maurizio Mattioli as Remo
 Sascha Zacharias as Britt

References

External links
 
 

2009 films
2000s Italian-language films
2000s sex comedy films
Italian sex comedy films
2009 comedy films
Films directed by Carlo Vanzina